William Christmas (born December 8, 1993) is an American professional basketball player for the Musel Pikes of the Total League.

College career
Christmas was the only player in the history of the Cal Poly Pomona Broncos to be in the top 10 in the statistical categories of points, rebounds, and assists. Along the way, he also garnered many distinctions that became a testimony of his performance on the court

Professional career
After going undrafted in the 2020 NBA draft, Christmas has agreed to a deal with the German team, Dragons Rhöndorf, for the 2021–22 season. In his first ever professional game, he recorded 19 points and 10 rebounds in a 74–107 loss to WWE Muenster. He followed up his performance with 18 points, 9 rebounds and 5 steals as they were defeated by 40 points by the SC Wedel, 44–84.

On November 30, 2021, it was reported by the team in their official website that Christmas would be leaving their team to sign for a team in Luxembourg. In his departing remarks, he commended the fans of Rhondorf for their special energy that they bring every game. He officially signed with the Musel Pikes of the Total League on January 9, 2022.

Personal life 
During his four-year college career, Christmas was able to pursue and finish his college degree in Kinesiology. In an interview, he stated that it is important for a person to pursue a college degree despite their involvement in athletic programs. He also stated that his idols that he looked after and patterned his playing style to, were NBA legends Michael Jordan, LeBron James, Kobe Bryant, Magic Johnson, and Kareem Abdul-Jabbar. His favorite NBA team is the Los Angeles Lakers, bestowing homage to the greatness of the team and its impacts on his home state.

References

External links
eurobasket.com profile
Cal Poly Pomona Broncos bio
scoutbasketball.com profile

1993 births
Living people
American expatriate basketball people in Germany
American men's basketball players
Basketball players from California
Cal Poly Pomona Broncos men's basketball players
Small forwards
Sportspeople from Oceanside, California